The Memoirs of an Amnesiac is the autobiography of composer, radio, and television personality Oscar Levant. Published in 1965 by G. P. Putnam's Sons, it was Levant's second best-seller, following a quarter-century after his first book, A Smattering of Ignorance.

Levant intersperses his reminisces about Hollywood in its heyday with one-liners and pithy quotes by himself and others. When asked about writing a book on Victor Herbert by a publisher, for example, Levant remarked "I wouldn't even read one!" Dorothy Parker, when Levant asked her if she ever took sleeping pills, supposedly answered, "In a big bowl with sugar and cream."

Witty, acerbic, and often self-deprecating, the book casually drops scores of famous names such as Levant's good friend George Gershwin, Arturo Toscanini, Otto Klemperer, William Faulkner, Harpo Marx, Irving Berlin, and Joseph P. Kennedy. It serves as both a Who's Who of Hollywood over three decades—skewering fellow musicians, actors, conductors, politicians, and gangsters--and a harrowing personal tale of neuroses and obsessions. Levant details in particular his harrowing time in psychiatric wards, his addictions to Demerol and paraldehyde; his experiences with electroconvulsive therapy, well-meaning but useless psychiatrists, and unscrupulous quacks; and how his long-suffering wife June and his three daughters endured his numerous eccentricities, superstitions, and hangups. 

I was an inert, happy-go-lucky derelict who could
have been created by Gogol.

I have a sixth sense; I lack the other five.

When Jack Paar asked Levant what he did for exercise, Oscar answered, "I stumble and fall into a coma."

When Oscar told his wife June that he was in the hospital again, she responded with "Gesundheit!"

External links
Posthumous treatment of Oscar Levant – Commentary Magazine

1965 non-fiction books
Show business memoirs
G. P. Putnam's Sons books